Pelargoderus fulvoirroratus is a species of beetle in the family Cerambycidae. It was described by Blanchard in 1853. It is known from Moluccas.

References

fulvoirroratus
Beetles described in 1853